The 2017–18 Los Angeles Lakers season was the franchise's 70th season, its 69th season in the National Basketball Association (NBA), and its 58th in Los Angeles.

On December 18, 2017 against the Golden State Warriors, the Lakers retired the numbers 8 and 24 of former shooting guard Kobe Bryant, making him the first NBA player to have two numbers retired on the same team.

Draft

Originally, the Lakers were at risk of losing their own first round pick this year to the Philadelphia 76ers due to the stipulations of a previous trade involving Steve Nash and the Phoenix Suns and having less than 50% odds of keeping the pick despite having the third-worst record that season. However, they not only kept the pick, but also moved up a spot in the process. The Lakers will ultimately lose their first round pick for the 2018 NBA draft, regardless of whether it goes to the 76ers or the Boston Celtics later on, but they will at least keep their first round pick for the 2019 NBA draft as opposed to giving it to the Orlando Magic as a result of their Dwight Howard trade around the same period. Their original second first round pick at #28, however, came from the Houston Rockets as an incentive to trade away Lou Williams in exchange for Corey Brewer. On June 20, two days before the draft began, the Lakers would acquire a new first round pick by getting the worst of the Brooklyn Nets' first round picks at #27 alongside their star center Brook Lopez in a trade in exchange for star combo guard D'Angelo Russell and Russian center Timofey Mozgov. On draft night, though, the Lakers acquired two more picks in the draft by trading their weakest first round pick (which became power forward/center Tony Bradley from the most recent NCAA Champions in North Carolina University) to the Utah Jazz for Picks #30 & 42 in this year's draft.

With the 2nd pick of the draft, the Lakers selected their hometown star Lonzo Ball, who played point guard during his sole season at UCLA. During that time there, Lonzo averaged a league-leading 7.6 assists to go with 14.6 points, 6.0 rebounds, 1.8 steals, and 0.8 blocks per game in 36 total games there. He also earned the Wayman Tisdale Award, the Pac-12 Freshman of The Year Award, First Team All-Pac-12 Honors, and consensus First-Team All-American Honors in the process. Next up, with the pick they acquired from the Brooklyn Nets, the Lakers took power forward Kyle Kuzma from the University of Utah. In Kuzma's final year at Utah, he joined Ball in being a member of the All-Pac-12 First Team by averaging 16.4 points, 9.3 rebounds, and 2.4 assists as a junior. With their last pick in the first round of the draft, the Lakers selected senior shooting guard Josh Hart from Villanova University. Throughout his time there (which included an NCAA Championship in his junior season), Hart averaged 13.1 points, 5.5 rebounds, and 1.8 assists per game at Villanova while earning plenty of awards in each of his last three seasons there. The Lakers ended their draft night by taking sophomore power forward/center Thomas Bryant from Indiana University. In his time at Indiana, Bryant averaged 12.2 points, 6.2 rebounds, 1.2 blocks, and nearly an assist per game throughout his college career. He made the Big 10 Conference's Freshman Team and the All-Big 10 Third Team Honors in his first season there.

Roster

<noinclude>

Standings

Division

Conference

Game log

Preseason

|- style="background:#fbb;"
| 1
| September 30
| Minnesota
| 
| Kyle Kuzma (19)
| Larry Nance Jr. (9)
| Ball, Ennis (8)
| Honda Center18,000
| 0–1
|- style="background:#fbb;"
| 2
| October 2
| Denver
| 
| Kyle Kuzma (23)
| Julius Randle (10)
| four players (4)
| Staples Center17,218
| 0–2
|- style="background:#fbb;"
| 3
| October 4
| Denver
| 
| Jordan Clarkson (24)
| Julius Randle (6)
| Briante Weber (5)
| Citizens Business Bank Arena17,000
| 0–3
|- style="background:#bfb;"
| 4
| October 8
| Sacramento
| 
| Julius Randle (17)
| Julius Randle (10)
| Alex Caruso (5)
| T-Mobile Arena13,094
| 1–3
|- style="background:#fbb;"
| 5
| October 10
| Utah
| 
| Clarkson, Kuzma (18)
| Alex Caruso (6)
| Alex Caruso (10)
| Staples Center15,054
| 1–4
|- style="background:#bfb;"
| 6
| October 13
| @ LA Clippers
| 
| Brook Lopez (16)
| Nance Jr., Randle (7)
| Ingram, Kuzma, Caldwell-Pope (5)
| Staples Center16,711
| 2–4

Regular season

|- style="background:#fbb;"
| 1
| October 19
| L.A. Clippers
| 
| Brook Lopez (20)
| Larry Nance Jr. (12)
| Ball, Ingram (4)
| Staples Center18,997
| 0–1
|- style="background:#bfb;"
| 2
| October 20
| @ Phoenix
| 
| Lonzo Ball (29)
| Ball, Lopez (11)
| Lonzo Ball (9)
| Talking Stick Resort Arena18,055
| 1–1
|- style="background:#fbb;"
| 3
| October 22
| New Orleans
| 
| Jordan Clarkson (24)
| Lonzo Ball (8)
| Lonzo Ball (13)
| Staples Center18,997
| 1–2
|- style="background:#bfb;"
| 4
| October 25
| Washington
| 
| Brandon Ingram (19)
| Ingram, Nance Jr. (10)
| Lonzo Ball (10)
| Staples Center18,996
| 2–2
|- style="background:#fbb;"
| 5
| October 27
| Toronto
| 
| Julius Randle (18)
| Kyle Kuzma (10)
| Lonzo Ball (6)
| Staples Center17,876
| 2–3
|- style="background:#fbb;"
| 6
| October 28
| @ Utah
| 
| Brandon Ingram (16)
| Larry Nance Jr. (10)
| Lonzo Ball (4)
| Vivint Smart Home Arena18,306
| 2–4
|- style="background:#bfb;"
| 7
| October 31
| Detroit
| 
| Julius Randle (17)
| Larry Nance Jr. (12)
| Brandon Ingram (6)
| Staples Center17,569
| 3–4

|- style="background:#fbb;"
| 8
| November 2
| @ Portland
| 
| Brook Lopez (27)
| Julius Randle (6)
| Ball, Clarkson (4)
| Moda Center19,469
| 3–5
|- style="background:#bfb;"
| 9
| November 3
| Brooklyn
| 
| Brook Lopez (34)
| Kyle Kuzma (13)
| Lonzo Ball (7)
| Staples Center18,997
| 4–5
|- style="background:#bfb;"
| 10
| November 5
| Memphis
| 
| Brook Lopez (21)
| Kyle Kuzma (12)
| Lonzo Ball (9)
| Staples Center18,997
| 5–5
|- style="background:#fbb;"
| 11
| November 8
| @ Boston
| 
| Jordan Clarkson (18)
| Julius Randle (12)
| Lonzo Ball (6)
| TD Garden18,624
| 5–6
|- style="background:#fbb;"
| 12
| November 9
| @ Washington
| 
| Lopez, Clarkson (15)
| Kyle Kuzma (9)
| Lonzo Ball (8)
| Capital One Arena20,173
| 5–7
|- style="background:#fbb;"
| 13
| November 11
| @ Milwaukee
| 
| Kyle Kuzma (21)
| Lonzo Ball (12)
| Lonzo Ball (13)
| BMO Harris Bradley Center18,717
| 5–8
|- style="background:#bfb;"
| 14
| November 13
| @ Phoenix
| 
| Jordan Clarkson (25)
| Brook Lopez (10)
| Lonzo Ball (5)
| Talking Stick Resort Arena17,533
| 6–8
|- style="background:#fbb;"
| 15
| November 15
| Philadelphia
| 
| Brandon Ingram (26)
| Brandon Ingram (11)
| Jordan Clarkson (5)
| Staples Center18,997
| 6–9
|- style="background:#fbb;"
| 16
| November 17
| Phoenix
| 
| Kyle Kuzma (30)
| Kuzma, Lopez (10)
| Lonzo Ball (6)
| Staples Center18,997
| 6–10
|- style="background:#bfb;"
| 17
| November 19
| Denver
| 
| Julius Randle (24)
| Lonzo Ball (16)
| Lonzo Ball (11)
| Staples Center18,997
| 7–10
|- style="background:#bfb;"
| 18
| November 21
| Chicago
| 
| Kyle Kuzma (22)
| Lonzo Ball (13)
| Ingram, Kuzma (5)
| Staples Center18,997
| 8–10
|- style="background:#fbb;"
| 19
| November 22
| @ Sacramento
| 
| Kentavious Caldwell-Pope (20)
| Julius Randle (8)
| Lonzo Ball (11)
| Golden 1 Center17,583
| 8–11
|- style="background:#fbb;"
| 20
| November 27
| @ L.A. Clippers
| 
| Kentavious Caldwell-Pope (29)
| Clarkson, Nance Jr. (8)
| Lonzo Ball (7)
| Staples Center18,086
| 8–12
|- style="background:#fbb;"
| 21
| November 29
| Golden State
| 
| Brandon Ingram (32)
| Kentavious Caldwell-Pope (7)
| Lonzo Ball (10)
| Staples Center18,997
| 8–13

|- style="background:#fbb;"
| 22
| December 2
| @ Denver
| 
| Brandon Ingram (20)
| Kyle Kuzma (10)
| Lonzo Ball (5)
| Pepsi Center19,520
| 8–14
|- style="background:#fbb;"
| 23
| December 3
| Houston
| 
| Kyle Kuzma (22)
| Kyle Kuzma (12)
| Brandon Ingram (5)
| Staples Center18,997
| 8–15
|- style="background:#bfb;"
| 24
| December 7
| @ Philadelphia
| 
| Brandon Ingram (21)
| Lonzo Ball (8)
| Lonzo Ball (8)
| Wells Fargo Center20,495
| 9–15
|- style="background:#bfb;"
| 25
| December 9
| @ Charlotte
| 
| Jordan Clarkson (22)
| Kyle Kuzma (14)
| Lonzo Ball (9)
| Spectrum Center19,320
| 10–15
|- style="background:#fbb;"
| 26
| December 12
| @ New York
| 
| Kentavious Caldwell-Pope (24)
| Larry Nance Jr. (9)
| Lonzo Ball (6)
| Madison Square Garden19,359
| 10–16
|- style="background:#fbb;"
| 27
| December 14
| @ Cleveland
| 
| Brandon Ingram (26)
| Larry Nance Jr. (12)
| Lonzo Ball (11)
| Quicken Loans Arena20,562
| 10–17
|- style="background:#fbb;"
| 28
| December 18
| Golden State
| 
| Kyle Kuzma (25)
| Julius Randle (11)
| Lonzo Ball (6)
| Staples Center18,997
| 10–18
|- style="background:#bfb;"
| 29
| December 20
| @ Houston
| 
| Kyle Kuzma (38)
| Ball, Nance Jr. (9)
| Brandon Ingram (6)
| Toyota Center18,055
| 11–18
|- style="background:#fbb;"
| 30
| December 22
| @ Golden State
| 
| Kyle Kuzma (27)
| Kyle Kuzma (14)
| Lonzo Ball (5)
| Oracle Arena19,596
| 11–19
|- style="background:#fbb;"
| 31
| December 23
| Portland
| 
| Clarkson, Kuzma (18)
| Josh Hart (10)
| Lonzo Ball (11)
| Staples Center18,997
| 11–20
|- style="background:#fbb;"
| 32
| December 25
| Minnesota
| 
| Kyle Kuzma (31)
| Julius Randle (7)
| Jordan Clarkson (7)
| Staples Center18,997
| 11–21
|- style="background:#fbb;"
| 33
| December 27
| Memphis
| 
| Brandon Ingram (23)
| Larry Nance Jr. (9)
| Brandon Ingram (4)
| Staples Center18,997
| 11–22
|- style="background:#fbb;"
| 34
| December 29
| L.A. Clippers
| 
| Jordan Clarkson (20)
| Caldwell-Pope, Randle (7)
| Jordan Clarkson (8)
| Staples Center18,997
| 11–23
|- style="background:#fbb;"
| 35
| December 31
| @ Houston
| 
| Julius Randle (29)
| Julius Randle (15)
| Tyler Ennis (11)
| Toyota Center18,179
| 11–24

|- style="background:#fbb;"
| 36
| January 1
| @ Minnesota
| 
| Jordan Clarkson (20)
| Julius Randle (12)
| Clarkson, Ennis (4)
| Target Center18,978
| 11–25
|- style="background:#fbb;"
| 37
| January 3
| Oklahoma City
| 
| Kyle Kuzma (18)
| Larry Nance Jr. (7)
| Tyler Ennis (6)
| Staples Center18,997
| 11–26
|- style="background:#fbb;"
| 38
| January 5
| Charlotte
| 
| Brandon Ingram (22)
| Brandon Ingram (14)
| Lonzo Ball (5)
| Staples Center18,997
| 11–27
|- style="background:#bfb;"
| 39
| January 7
| Atlanta
| 
| Brandon Ingram (20)
| Lonzo Ball (10)
| Brandon Ingram (7)
| Staples Center18,997
| 12–27
|- style="background:#bfb;"
| 40
| January 9
| Sacramento
| 
| Julius Randle (22)
| Julius Randle (14)
| Lonzo Ball (11)
| Staples Center18,997
| 13–27
|- style="background:#bfb;"
| 41
| January 11
| San Antonio
| 
| Brandon Ingram (26)
| Lonzo Ball (10)
| Lonzo Ball (6)
| Staples Center18,997
| 14–27
|- style="background:#bfb;"
| 42
| January 13
| @ Dallas
| 
| Julius Randle (23)
| Julius Randle (15)
| Lonzo Ball (7)
| American Airlines Center20,209
| 15–27
|- style="background:#fbb;"
| 43
| January 15
| @ Memphis
| 
| Kentavious Caldwell-Pope (27)
| Larry Nance Jr. (11)
| Kyle Kuzma (5)
| FedExForum17,794
| 15–28
|- style="background:#fbb;"
| 44
| January 17
| @ Oklahoma City
| 
| Julius Randle (16)
| Larry Nance Jr. (6)
| Clarkson, Ennis, Ingram, Randle (3)
| Chesapeake Energy Arena18,203
| 15–29
|- style="background:#bfb;"
| 45
| January 19
| Indiana
| 
| Jordan Clarkson (33)
| Larry Nance Jr. (11)
| Jordan Clarkson (7)
| Staples Center18,997
| 16–29
|- style="background:#bfb;"
| 46
| January 21
| New York
| 
| Jordan Clarkson (29)
| Julius Randle (12)
| Jordan Clarkson (10)
| Staples Center18,997
| 17–29
|- style="background:#bfb;"
| 47
| January 23
| Boston
| 
| Kyle Kuzma (28)
| Julius Randle (14)
| Clarkson, Ingram (4)
| Staples Center18,997
| 18–29
|- style="background:#bfb;"
| 48
| January 26
| @ Chicago
| 
| Brandon Ingram (25)
| Brandon Ingram (9)
| Brandon Ingram (5)
| United Center21,827
| 19–29
|- style="background:#fbb;"
| 49
| January 28
| @ Toronto
| 
| Clarkson, Randle (17)
| Julius Randle (10)
| Caruso, Randle (5)
| Air Canada Centre19,800
| 19–30
|- style="background:#fbb;"
| 50
| January 31
| @ Orlando
| 
| Clarkson, Randle (20)
| Julius Randle (9)
| Brandon Ingram (5)
| Amway Center18,553
| 19–31

|- style="background:#bfb;"
| 51
| February 2
| @ Brooklyn
| 
| Lopez, Randle (19)
| Josh Hart (14)
| Brandon Ingram (10)
| Barclays Center17,732
| 20–31
|- style="background:#bfb;"
| 52
| February 4
| @ Oklahoma City
| 
| Brook Lopez (20)
| Josh Hart (11)
| Lopez, Ingram (5)
| Chesapeake Energy Arena18,203
| 21–31
|- style="background:#bfb;"
| 53
| February 6
| Phoenix
| 
| Brandon Ingram (26)
| Josh Hart (11)
| Clarkson, Ingram, Randle (5)
| Staples Center18,997
| 22–31
|- style="background:#bfb;"
| 54
| February 8
| Oklahoma City
| 
| Kentavious Caldwell-Pope (20)
| Brook Lopez (9)
| Brandon Ingram (6)
| Staples Center18,997
| 23–31
|- style="background:#fbb;"
| 55
| February 10
| @ Dallas
| 
| Julius Randle (26)
| Kyle Kuzma (15)
| Julius Randle (7)
| American Airlines Center20,162
| 23–32
|- style="background:#fbb;"
| 56
| February 14
| @ New Orleans
| 
| Kyle Kuzma (23)
| Kentavious Caldwell-Pope (8)
| Kentavious Caldwell-Pope (8)
| Smoothie King Center15,436
| 23–33
|- style="background:#fbb;"
| 57
| February 15
| @ Minnesota
| 
| Julius Randle (23)
| Caldwell-Pope, Zubac (11)
| Kentavious Caldwell-Pope (6)
| Target Center 17,534
| 23–34
|- style="background:#bfb;"
| 58
| February 23
| Dallas
| 
| Julius Randle (18)
| Julius Randle (13)
| Julius Randle (10)
| Staples Center18,997
| 24–34
|- style="background:#bfb;"
| 59
| February 24
| @ Sacramento
| 
| Kentavious Caldwell-Pope (34)
| Julius Randle (13)
| Brandon Ingram (8)
| Golden 1 Center17,583
| 25–34
|- style="background:#bfb;"
| 60
| February 26
| @ Atlanta
| 
| Brandon Ingram (21)
| Kentavious Caldwell-Pope (14)
| Brandon Ingram (6)
| Philips Arena16,328
| 26–34

|- style="background:#bfb;"
| 61
| March 1
| @ Miami
| 
| Isaiah Thomas (29)
| Randle, Ball, Kuzma (6)
| Lonzo Ball (7)
| American Airlines Arena19,600
| 27–34
|- style="background:#bfb;"
| 62
| March 3
| @ San Antonio
| 
| Julius Randle (25)
| Kentavious Caldwell-Pope (13)
| Lonzo Ball (11)
| AT&T Center18,557
| 28–34
|- style="background:#fbb;"
| 63
| March 5
| Portland
| 
| Julius Randle (21)
| Julius Randle (9)
| Isaiah Thomas (7)
| Staples Center18,997
| 28–35
|- style="background:#bfb;"
| 64
| March 7
| Orlando
| 
| Brook Lopez (27)
| Julius Randle (11)
| Isaiah Thomas (9)
| Staples Center18,997
| 29–35
|- style="background:#fbb;"
| 65
| March 9
| @ Denver
| 
| Brook Lopez (29)
| Kentavious Caldwell-Pope (9)
| Lonzo Ball (8)
| Pepsi Center19,807
| 29–36
|- style="background:#bfb;"
| 66
| March 11
| Cleveland
| 
| Julius Randle (36)
| Julius Randle (14)
| Isaiah Thomas (9)
| Staples Center18,997
| 30–36
|- style="background:#bfb;"
| 67
| March 13
| Denver
| 
| Randle, Kuzma (26)
| Randle, Kuzma (13)
| Lonzo Ball (8)
| Staples Center18,997
| 31–36
|- style="background:#fbb;"
| 68
| March 14
| @ Golden State
| 
| Julius Randle (22)
| Julius Randle (10)
| Lonzo Ball (11)
| Oracle Arena19,596
| 31–37
|- style="background:#fbb;"
| 69
| March 16
| Miami
| 
| Julius Randle (25)
| Julius Randle (12)
| Lonzo Ball (8)
| Staples Center18,997
| 31–38
|- style="background:#fbb;"
| 70
| March 19
| @ Indiana
| 
| Kyle Kuzma (27)
| Julius Randle (9)
| Lonzo Ball (8)
| Bankers Life Fieldhouse16,603
| 31–39
|- style="background:#fbb;"
| 71
| March 22
| @ New Orleans
| 
| Kentavious Caldwell-Pope (28)
| Lonzo Ball (13)
| Lonzo Ball (9)
| Smoothie King Center18,037
| 31–40
|- style="background:#bfb;"
| 72
| March 24
| @ Memphis
| 
| Kyle Kuzma (25)
| Julius Randle (11)
| Lonzo Ball (10)
| FedExForum18,119
| 32–40
|- style="background:#fbb;"
| 73
| March 26
| @ Detroit
| 
| Julius Randle (23)
| Randle, Kuzma (11)
| Lonzo Ball (11)
| Little Caesars Arena18,718
| 32–41
|- style="background:#bfb;"
| 74
| March 28
| Dallas
| 
| Brook Lopez (22)
| Julius Randle (10)
| Lonzo Ball (11)
| Staples Center18,997
| 33–41
|- style="background:#fbb;"
| 75
| March 30
| Milwaukee
| 
| Kyle Kuzma (27)
| Josh Hart (13)
| Caruso, Ingram, Kuzma (6)
| Staples Center18,997
| 33–42

|- style="background:#fbb;"
| 76
| April 1
| Sacramento
| 
| Julius Randle (19)
| Ivica Zubac (10)
| Ennis, Hart (4)
| Staples Center18,997
| 33–43
|- style="background:#fbb;"
| 77
| April 3
| @ Utah
| 
| Kentavious Caldwell-Pope (28)
| Julius Randle (12)
| Julius Randle (9)
| Vivint Smart Home Arena18,306
| 33–44
|- style="background:#bfb;"
| 78
| April 4
| San Antonio
| 
| Kyle Kuzma (30)
| Josh Hart (10)
| Tyler Ennis (7)
| Staples Center18,997
| 34–44
|- style="background:#fbb;"
| 79
| April 6
| Minnesota
| 
| Hart, Randle (20)
| Josh Hart (11)
| Ennis, Payton II (4)
| Staples Center18,997
| 34–45
|- style="background:#fbb;"
| 80
| April 8
| Utah
| 
| Josh Hart (25)
| Julius Randle (7)
| Julius Randle (4)
| Staples Center18,997
| 34–46
|- style="background:#fbb;"
| 81
| April 10
| Houston
| 
| Josh Hart (20)
| Julius Randle (8)
| Alex Caruso (6)
| Staples Center18,997
| 34–47
|- style="background:#bfb;"
| 82
| April 11
| @ L.A. Clippers
| 
| Josh Hart (30)
| Gary Payton II (12)
| Andre Ingram (6)
| Staples Center19,068
| 35–47

Transactions

Trades

Free agency

Re-signed

Additions

Subtractions

References

2017-18
2017–18 NBA season by team
Los Angeles Lakers
Los Angeles Lakers
Lakers
Lakers